Ri Myung-hun (Korean: 리명훈; born 14 September 1967), also known as Michael Ri after his favorite basketball player Michael Jordan, is a North Korean former basketball player.

Basketball career
Ri played the center position for the national basketball team of the Democratic People's Republic of Korea. According to the Associated Press, he was "the world's tallest basketball player."

In anticipation of joining the NBA, Ri worked out in Canada, where he was scouted by numerous teams. But he was unable to play in the league because of the U.S. ban on trade with North Korea, which is set forth in a piece of legislation called the Trading with the Enemy Act of 1917. The U.S. Department of State permitted Ri to compete in the country in 2000, on the main condition that none of Ri's salary could be repatriated to North Korea. North Korean officials responded by refusing to let Ri leave. Kim Jong-il told NBA scout Tony Ronzone he would allow Ri to leave North Korea and play professional basketball if the team paid Kim's government in wheat. Ri was permitted to conduct an interview with CNN's Mike Chinoy in which he was quoted as saying, "I'm a big man. I want to test my ability. I am not interested in money or politics. As a sportsman, I just want to try." Eventually, Ri said he was content to remain playing basketball in the "bosom" of North Korean supreme leader Kim Jong-il. In a game between mixed teams of players from North Korea and South Korea, Ri scored 26 points in 21 minutes, though his "dankyol" (solidarity) side lost 141–138.

Personal life
On 28 December 2011, North Korean television showed footage from the funeral of Kim Jong-il in which an unusually tall person was seen in the crowd. The person was speculated to have been Ri Myung-hun.

References

1967 births
Living people
North Korean men's basketball players
Basketball players at the 1990 Asian Games
Basketball players at the 2002 Asian Games
Asian Games competitors for North Korea
Centers (basketball)